BioMedical Engineering OnLine is a peer-reviewed online-only open access scientific journal covering biomedical engineering. It was established in 2002 and is published by BioMed Central. The editors-in-chief are Ervin Sejdic (University of Pittsburgh and Fong-Chin Su (National Cheng Kung University). According to the Journal Citation Reports, the journal has a 2018 impact factor of 2.013.

References

External links

BioMed Central academic journals
Online-only journals
Publications established in 2002
English-language journals
Biomedical engineering journals